'Fighting' Bob Martin (November 11, 1897 – 1978) was a heavyweight boxer who became the Heavyweight Champion of the American Expeditionary Forces
and Inter-Allied Armies during World War I. He fought against future heavyweight champion, Gene Tunney, in 1918, but lost in 4 rounds.

External links
 Requiem for a Heavyweight: The ‘Fighting Bob’ Martin Story

1897 births
1978 deaths

Heavyweight boxers
Place of birth missing
United States Army personnel of World War I
American male boxers